Paul Martin (born 5 January 1959) is a British antiques dealer and professional drummer, best known for being the presenter of various BBC television antiques programmes including Flog It!, Trust Me, I'm a Dealer and Paul Martin's Handmade Revolution.

Biography
Martin was born in Teddington, Middlesex. His family subsequently moved to Cornwall, where he was educated at Falmouth Grammar School and then studied art and woodworking at Falmouth College of Arts (now Falmouth University).

He then developed parallel careers, as an antiques trader and dealer and as a session musician drummer. Martin worked with Average White Band, The Quireboys and The Dogs D'Amour in the 1990s.

From the age of 25, he owned a pitch on London's Portobello Road. He also worked as an antiques props stylist for magazines including Marie Claire and New Woman, whilst undertaking larger projects designing antique sets for television shoots for BBC One's The Clothes Show and Granada TV. More recently he ran the shop The Table Gallery in Marlborough, Wiltshire, specialising in 17th- and 18th-century Welsh and English oak furniture and Victorian lavatories.
Paul now runs an antique shop in Corsham, Wiltshire

Television presenting 
Martin was discovered by a team from BBC Bristol when he was interviewed about his passion for oak furniture. He was then signed up in 2002 to present Flog It!, which has led to a series of television shows and spin-off books.

In 2011 he presented To the Manor Reborn alongside Penelope Keith, covering the refurbishment of Avebury Manor in Wiltshire for the National Trust. In 2014, he began hosting I Never Knew That About Britain for the ITV network. He presented the BBC Countryfile spin-offs Summer Diaries, Spring Diaries, Autumn Diaries and Winter Diaries in 2016 and 2017.

On 2 October 2018, the BBC announced it would cancel Flog It!, but that Martin would return to host two new similar shows as part of its "modernised" new daytime schedule—one of which would use Martin's skills as a dealer to train members of the public, the second being an antiques-based game show. The first of these programmes, Make Me a Dealer, began its inaugural series on 5 November 2018, followed by the antiques game show Curiosity in spring 2019.

Books 

Paul Martin has written a popular book on antiques, Paul Martin: My World of Antiques, subtitled ‘Collect, buy and sell everyday antiques like an expert’. The book draws on his experiences on ‘Flog It!’ and includes chapters on various types of antiques and interviews with a number of other experts.

Personal life
Martin married BBC production co-ordinator Charlotte Godfrey in 2007.

References

External links 
 
 Paul Martin goes behind the scenes of Flog it!

1959 births
Living people
People from Teddington
People from Falmouth, Cornwall
Alumni of Falmouth University
English drummers
British male drummers
English television presenters
Antiques experts
People educated at Falmouth Grammar School